Paper Valuation is the value of privately held shares that is not directly tradeable at an exchange. This notional value, though, is as yet untested on real buyers. 

The opposite of paper value is exchangeable value, and is the value that is directly monetizable as long as there is a willing buyer and a willing seller.

Thus, if the aside exchange was made as an "Exchange Valuation" this new company valuation would be tradeable directly on the stock exchange. One problem with Paper Valuation is that it is not that easy to monetize in a short time period.

This valuation concept is a cornerstone in the stock exchange world. Value exchange is paramount to its existence.

See also
Pre-money valuation
Post-money valuation

Stock market
Valuation_(finance)